Van Dien is a surname of Dutch origin. Notable people with the surname include:

Casper Van Dien (born 1968), American actor
Elsa van Dien (1914–2007), American astronomer
Grace Van Dien (born 1966), American actress

See also
Văn Điển Railway Station, railway station in Vietnam
Van Dien House, historic house in Ridgewood, New Jersey
Harmon Van Dien House, historic house in Paramus, New Jersey

Surnames of Dutch origin